Gordon "Gordy" Brown was a college football player. He was a prominent lineman for the Texas Longhorns, captain of their 1930 team.

References

Texas Longhorns football players
All-Southern college football players
All-American college football players
American football tackles